Gorakh Paswan is an India politician who was elected as an MLA twice (in 2012 and in 2017) from Belthara Road constituency in Uttar Pradesh. He belongs to the Samajwadi Party. In 2015, he received death threats to leave the politics. His son Sudheer Kumar is also an SP Politician and was elected from Ballia in 2016.

References 

Year of birth missing (living people)
Living people
Uttar Pradesh politicians
Samajwadi Party politicians
Samajwadi Party politicians from Uttar Pradesh